30 Odd Foot of Grunts were an Australian rock group, formed in 1992, with Russell Crowe on lead vocals, Dean Cochran on guitar, Garth Adam on bass, Dave Kelly on drums, Dave Wilkins on guitar and vocal, and Stewart Kirwan on trumpet.

Discography

Studio albums

Video albums

Charting singles

References

Musical groups from Sydney
1992 establishments in Australia
2005 disestablishments in Australia
Musical groups established in 1992
Musical groups disestablished in 2005